Jon Charles Naekauna Francis (born June 21, 1964) is former American football player.  He is the son of former Green Bay Packer Joe Francis, and half-brother of Detroit Lions 2007 second-round draft pick Ikaika Alama-Francis.
He is now a Machinist at ATI Specialty Alloys and Components.

High school and college football
Francis attended Corvallis High School in Corvallis, Oregon and starred in football. Francis played strong safety and tailback for the Spartans.  His senior year rushing total of 1702 yards in 1981 was the school record until 2004.

Francis attended Colorado State University, Taft Community College, and Boise State University, where he played running back.

Professional career

Francis was drafted in the seventh round of the 1986 NFL Draft by the New York Giants, who went on to become world champions that season.  After being injured, Francis did not even suit up and was cut by the New York Giants in 1986. Francis signed with the New England Patriots in 1987.  The seven other "rookie" running backs along with Francis, who were not drafted, also saw no preseason game time before being released. When the NFL players went on strike a month later, Francis chose to sign with the Los Angeles Rams as a replacement during the four-game strike. As a replacement, he saw his first live game carries. Former U.S.C. coach John Robinson kept him, and he was the only replacement player to make the team. That strike, brought about the "practice squads" some years later, through union contract negotiations.  He played in 9 games and had 35 carries for 138 yards and 8 receptions for 38 yards (2 touchdowns).

References

1964 births
Living people
American football running backs
Boise State Broncos football players
Corvallis High School (Oregon) alumni
Los Angeles Rams players
Native Hawaiian sportspeople
Players of American football from Oregon
Sportspeople from Corvallis, Oregon
National Football League replacement players